The Acadian Federation of Nova Scotia (Fédération acadienne de la Nouvelle-Écosse) was created in 1968 with a mission to "promote the growth and global development of the Acadian and Francophone community of Nova Scotia."

The Fédération acadienne is the official voice of the Acadian and Francophone population of Nova Scotia. The Fédération acadienne presently has 29 regional, provincial and institutional members.

In 1996, the Federation was instrumental in establishing the Acadian School Board (Conseil scolaire acadien provincial) in the province.

Members

Provincial Members
 Association acadienne des artistes de la Nouvelle-Écosse
 Association des juristes d'expression française de la Nouvelle-Écosse
 Association des radios communautaires de l'Atlantique
 Centre provincial de Ressources préscolaire
 Comité provincial des Jeux de l'Acadie, région Nouvelle-Écosse
 Conseil coopératif acadien de la Nouvelle-Écosse
 Conseil de développement économique de la Nouvelle-Écosse
 Conseil jeunesse provincial
 Équipe d'alphabétisation de la Nouvelle-Écosse
 Fédération culturelle acadienne de la Nouvelle-Écosse
 Fédération des femmes acadiennes de la Nouvelle-Écosse
 Fédération des parents acadiens de la Nouvelle-Écosse
 Société de Presse acadienne
 Regroupement des Aînées et Aînées de la Nouvelle-Écosse
 Réseau Santé Nouvelle-Écosse
 Société Maison acadienne
 Société promotion Grand-Pré

Regional Members

 Conseil acadien de Par-en-Bas, Argyle
 Société Saint-Pierre, Chéticamp
 Société acadienne de Clare
 Conseil communautaire du Grand-Havre, Halifax/Dartmouth
 Société acadienne Sainte-Croix, Pomquet
 Centre communautaire culturel La Picasse, Richmond
 Association du Centre communautaire de la Rive-Sud
 Centre scolaire communautaire Étoile de l'Acadie, Sydney
 Centre communautaire francophone de Truro
 Association francophone de la Vallée d'Annapolis

Institutional Members
 Conseil scolaire acadien provincial
 Université Sainte-Anne

References 

Culture of Nova Scotia
1968 establishments in Canada